Lamp in the Desert is a 1922 British silent drama film directed by F. Martin Thornton and starring Gladys Jennings, Louis Willoughby and George K. Arthur. It was adapted from a 1919 novel by Ethel M. Dell and turned into a script by Leslie Howard Gordon.

Plot
The film is a drama set in India. The story centers around a captain who forces a bigamist to feign death so that he can marry his widow.

Cast
 Gladys Jennings as Stella Denvers 
 Louis Willoughby as Captain Everard Monck 
 George K. Arthur as Tony Denvers 
 Joseph R. Tozer as Captain Raleigh Dacres 
 Teddy Arundell as Major Ralston 
 Lewis Gilbert as Colonel Mansfield 
 Tony Fraser as Waziri spy 
 Gladys Mason as Mrs Ralston

References

External links

1922 films
1922 drama films
British drama films
British silent feature films
1920s English-language films
Films directed by Floyd Martin Thornton
British black-and-white films
Films based on works by Ethel M. Dell
Films based on British novels
Stoll Pictures films
1920s British films
Silent drama films